The 69th Wales Rally GB was the thirteenth and final round of the 2013 World Rally Championship season and was held between 14 and 17 November 2013. This was the year the base of the rally moved from south to north Wales.

2013 World Rally Champion Sébastien Ogier took his first Wales Rally GB victory alongside Julien Ingrassia in the VW Polo R WRC. Previous winner Jari-Matti Latvala finished 2nd, also in a VW Polo WRC whilst Belgian Thierry Neuville finished off the podium. Local Welshman Elfyn Evans won the WRC2 category, French driver Quentin Gilbert won class 5 in the Citroen DS3 R3 and teenager Chris Ingram took the class 6 victory.

Conwy Castle was the start and Llandudno the finish point for the rally, while the service area was based in Deeside for the first time. New stages in North Wales were used such as Gwydyr and Chirk Castle.

Results

Event standings

Special Stages

Power Stage 
The "Power Stage" was a 7.52 km stage, SS19.

References 

Wales
Rally GB
Wales Rally
Wales Rally